Trinity Rectory is an historic building at the corner of Clarendon Street and Newbury Street in Boston, Massachusetts. It is a brick building built in 1880 by Henry Hobson Richardson and features flower-shaped reliefs carved directly into the brick exterior. The building was added to the National Historic Register in 1972.

Traditionally the residence of the rector of the Trinity Church, Boston, it has now been renovated to church office space when the current rector decided to live in a private residence.

See also 
 National Register of Historic Places listings in northern Boston, Massachusetts

References

Religious buildings and structures completed in 1880
Richardsonian Romanesque architecture in Massachusetts
Henry Hobson Richardson buildings
Back Bay, Boston
Houses in Boston
National Register of Historic Places in Boston
Historic district contributing properties in Massachusetts
Houses on the National Register of Historic Places in Suffolk County, Massachusetts
1880 establishments in Massachusetts